HMS Nile was a two-deck 90-gun second-rate ship of the line of the Royal Navy, launched on 28 June 1839 at Plymouth Dockyard. She was named to commemorate the Battle of the Nile in 1798. After service in the Baltic Sea and the North America and West Indies Station, she was converted to a training ship and renamed , surviving in that role until 1953.

Construction, reserve and conversion to steam
On completion but before commissioning, Nile went straight into reserve at Devonport. From December 1852 to January 1854, Nile was fitted with screw propulsion; the 500 horsepower engine was made by Sewards of Petersfield and the conversion cost £63,837. Once finally commissioned, she joined the Western Squadron under the command of Commodore Henry Byam Martin.

Crimean War in the Baltic

In May 1854, commanded by Captain George Rodney Mundy, Nile joined the Baltic Squadron in the Gulf of Finland, following the start of the Crimean War. On 18 September 1855, Niles boats boarded and burnt some Russian vessels, reportedly near Hammeliski (possibly Humaliski on the island of Björkö, now called Primorsk, Leningrad Oblast). At the end of that month, the fleet began to return to the United Kingdom and on 23 April 1856, participating ships, including Nile, attended a Review of the Fleet at Spithead by Queen Victoria. In June 1856, Nile sailed for Halifax, Nova Scotia; the flagship of Rear Admiral Arthur Flagshawe. She visited Bermuda and the Caribbean before returning to Plymouth in March 1857.

Home service and North America

Nile recommissioned in March 1858 under the command of Captain Henry Ducie Chads. When he was promoted to Vice Admiral, Nile became his flagship based at Queenstown in County Cork, Ireland. After exercising with the Channel Fleet during the summer, Nile departed for the North America and West Indies Station in October, but was caught in a hurricane and returned to Cork for repairs some forty days later. After further repairs at Plymouth, she finally started out for the Royal Naval Dockyard in the Imperial fortress colony of Bermuda (located in the North Atlantic, and administratively part of British North America, Bermuda was the headquarters and main base of the station) in April 1859 under the command of Captain Edward King Barnard and carrying the flag of Rear Admiral Alexander Milne, the Commander-in-Chief, North America and West Indies Station. Nile operated from Bermuda and Halifax during the tense period following the Trent Affair, when the United Kingdom's entry into the American Civil War seemed possible, eventually cementing cordial relations with the Union by means of a visit to New York City in September 1863. Returning to Plymouth in the following April, she was decommissioned and returned to the reserve, where her engines, boilers and propellers were removed.

Training ship at Liverpool as HMS Conway
In 1876 the ship was loaned to the Mercantile Marine Service Association as a training ship at Liverpool and renamed HMS Conway. She replaced the previous Conway (ex- which had proved to be too small. The third HMS Conway (ex-Nile) remained at a mooring off Rock Ferry Pier in Liverpool and was home to up to 250 cadets. She was refitted twice during this time. In October 1940, Conway was struck by SS Hektoria, a 13,000-ton whaling factory ship, and moved to a dock at Birkenhead for repairs. During the Liverpool Blitz there was concern that there might be considerable loss of life if the ship were hit and she moved to Glyn Garth Mooring on the Menai Straits, Anglesey, in May 1941. In 1949 she moved further along the Strait to a new mooring off Plas Newydd where a shore establishment was also established.

Loss
In 1953, it was decided to return Conway to Birkenhead for a refit. On 14 April, the ship left her moorings in the Menai Strait under tow, but was driven ashore shortly afterwards by unexpectedly strong tides and wrecked, watched by a large crowd on the Menai Suspension Bridge. A fire in 1956 then destroyed her. One may still find nails and timber at the site. Two Admiralty Pattern anchors from Conway survive; one at the Merseyside Maritime Museum in Liverpool and one on Caernarfon marine promenade.

Notes

External links

References

 
 Lavery, Brian (2003) The Ship of the Line - Volume 1: The development of the battlefleet 1650-1850. Conway Maritime Press. .
 

Ships of the line of the Royal Navy
Rodney-class ships of the line
Ships built in Plymouth, Devon
1839 ships
Crimean War naval ships of the United Kingdom
HMS Nile (1839)